Hubert Mairamhof was an Italian luger who competed in the late 1970s and early 1980s. A natural track luger, he won four medals at the FIL European Luge Natural Track Championships with one gold (Singles: 1978), two silvers (Doubles: 1978, 1981), and one bronze (Doubles: 1977).

References
Natural track European Championships results 1970-2006.

Italian lugers
Italian male lugers
Possibly living people
Year of birth missing
Sportspeople from Südtirol